Arkdale is an unincorporated census-designated place in the town of Strongs Prairie in Adams County, Wisconsin, United States. As of the 2020 Census, its population was 201.

Demographics

References

External links

History of Arkdale, Wisconsin and Trinity Lutheran Church, Wisconsin State Historical Society

Census-designated places in Adams County, Wisconsin
Census-designated places in Wisconsin